This is a '''list of Israeli Air Force aircraft squadrons.



Combat

Helicopter

Command and transport

Unmanned

Special

MRBM 
 150 Squadron (Israel)
 199 Squadron (Israel)
 248 Squadron (Israel)

References 

 GlobalSecurity.org list of IAF Squadrons
 Aeroflight.co.uk IAF section

Air Force aircraft squadrons
Israeli Air Force squadrons
Israeli Air Force